Oedignathus inermis is a species of king crab found off the Pacific coasts of the United States and Canada, from California to Alaska, and disjunctly around the coasts of Japan. It is the only species in the genus Oedignathus, and is sometimes called the granular claw crab, paxillose crab or tuberculate nestling lithode crab.

Characteristics
Oedignathus is distinguished from other king crabs in the subfamily Hapalogastrinae by the presence of numerous tubercles on the only slightly flattened chelipeds and legs, and by the paucity of spines, setae; other genera have flattened chelipeds covered in setae, and legs with several large spines.

Ecology
When in the littoral zone, O. inermis is associated with mussel beds, but it spends more time in the sublittoral zone. Larvae are released in January and February, at a similar time to other hermit crabs, perhaps to coincide with seasonal blooms of plankton for the larvae to feed on.

O. inermis is preyed upon by birds  such as the American black oystercatcher.

References

King crabs
Crustaceans of the eastern Pacific Ocean
Monotypic arthropod genera